Helen Timmons Henderson (May 23, 1877 – July 12, 1925) was a schoolteacher and politician from Virginia. She was the first woman ever to be nominated for the Virginia House of Delegates; with Sarah Lee Fain, in 1923, she was one of the first two women elected to that body, and to the Virginia General Assembly as a whole.

Life and career
Helen Timmons was born on May 23, 1877 Cass County, Missouri, where her parents were visiting, and grew up in Jefferson County, Tennessee. She attended Carson–Newman College in Jefferson City, Tennessee, where she studied to become a schoolteacher; one of her professors there was Robert Anderson Henderson, whom she would later marry. Upon her marriage she moved with her husband to Buchanan County, Virginia; there she was shocked by the limited educational opportunities available in southwest Virginia, and began efforts to correct the deficit.  These culminated in the foundation of the Baptist Mountain School in Council, in 1911, at which organization she served as assistant principal; her husband was the principal.  The leadership qualities she evinced in her role convinced a group of local Democratic Party leaders to suggest, in 1923, that she run for a seat in the Virginia House of Delegates.  She acquiesced, and proved to be not only an excellent campaigner, but a fine public speaker as well; unusually for the time, she drove her own car between campaign stops, and would sometimes speak at two in the same day. Henderson won election that November by a margin of over 400 votes.  The town of Council was at the time so remote that it took two days for news of her election to trickle in.

The Richmond Times-Dispatch described Henderson's opposition as coming "from some independent Democrats, Republicans, and wets", the latter referring to opponents of Prohibition. Of her role in Richmond, Henderson said: "I'm not in the Legislature for publicity. It's simply a question of public service with me, and a duty I owe to the people back in those counties which have elected me."
While in the General Assembly Henderson gained a reputation as an advocate for the interests of southwest Virginia, calling for more funding for roads and schools.  She was the first woman to preside over the Assembly, and sat on four Committees: Roads and Internal Navigation; Counties, Cities, and Towns; Moral and Social Welfare; and Executive Expenditures. Her health, however, had begun to fail in the spring of 1925, and she returned to her parents' home in Jefferson City; she died there in July, without the chance to run for reelection, although she had been unanimously renominated.  At her death governor E. Lee Trinkle praised her "many virtues, clear vision and noble aspirations", and ordered flags at the capitol building to be flown at half-staff in her honor.  Henderson is buried at Elm Grove Cemetery in Knoxville, Tennessee.

Henderson's daughter, Helen Ruth Henderson, would follow in her mother's footsteps, both as a schoolteacher and as a member of the Virginia House of Delegates, to which body she was first elected in 1927; in the 1928 session she was one of four women serving in the House.  She was the first woman to succeed her mother in the Virginia legislature, and the two were the first mother-daughter pair elected to any state legislature in the United States, followed soon after by Nellie Nugent Somerville and Lucy Somerville Howorth of Mississippi. With her husband Henderson also had a son, Robert Ashby Henderson.

Honors
The House of Delegates adopted the following resolution in memory of Helen Henderson:

A historical marker honoring Henderson in Buchanan County was erected in 2010 by the Virginia Department of Historic Resources.  A portion of Virginia Route 80 is named the "Helen Henderson Highway" in her honor, and she was inducted in 2013 into the Southwest Virginia Walk of Fame, located at the Southwest Virginia Museum Historical State Park in Big Stone Gap.

See also
Eva Mae Fleming Scott, the first woman elected to the Virginia State Senate, in 1979

References

1877 births
1925 deaths
People from Cass County, Missouri
People from Buchanan County, Virginia
Women state legislators in Virginia
Schoolteachers from Virginia
American women educators
Democratic Party members of the Virginia House of Delegates
Carson–Newman University alumni
People from Jefferson City, Tennessee
20th-century American politicians
20th-century American women politicians